Pedro Adão e Silva (born 1974) is a Portuguese politician from the Socialist Party. He is Minister of Culture in the XXIII Constitutional Government of Portugal.

References 

1974 births
Living people
European University Institute alumni
21st-century Portuguese politicians

Socialist Party (Portugal) politicians
Government ministers of Portugal
Culture ministers of Portugal